Solovyov, Solovyev, Solovjev, or Soloviev (Russian: Соловьёв) is a Russian masculine surname, its feminine forms are Solovyova, Solovyeva or Solovieva. It derives from the first name or nickname Solovei (соловей), which also means nightingale in Russian. The surname may refer to the following people:

Aleksei Solovyov (born 1996), Russian footballer
 Alexander Solovyov (disambiguation), multiple people
Alexey Soloviev (disambiguation), multiple people
 Anatoly Solovyev (born 1948), Russian cosmonaut
 Andrey Soloviev (1953–1993), Russian war photographer
Anjelika Solovieva (born 1980), Kyrgyz swimmer
 Anton Solovyov (disambiguation), multiple people
Denis Solovyov (born 1977), Russian footballer
 Dmitri Solovyov (disambiguation), multiple people
Irina Solovyova (born 1937), Soviet cosmonaut
Ivan Solovyov (born 1993), Russian football player
 Jegor Solovjov (1871–1942), Estonian politician
Leonid Solovyov (disambiguation), multiple people
Maksym Solovyov (born 2002), Ukrainian footballer
 Mikhail Solovyov (disambiguation), multiple people
Nikolay Solovyov (disambiguation), multiple people
Oleg Solovyov (born 1973), Russian footballer
 Pavel Solovyov (1917–1996), Russian aircraft engine engineer
Soloviev Design Bureau in Russia
 Sergey Solovyov (disambiguation), multiple people
 Sergey Alexandrovich Solovyov (1944–2021), Soviet/Russian film director
 Stefan Soloviev (born 1975), American Agriculture CEO
 Vasily Solovyov-Sedoi (1907–1979), Soviet composer
Viktor Solovyov (disambiguation), multiple people
 Vladimir Solovyov (disambiguation), multiple people
 Vladislav Solovyov (born 1973), Russian businessman
 Vsevolod Solovyov (1849–1903), Russian historical novelist
Vyacheslav Solovyov (disambiguation), multiple people
 Yuri Soloviev (disambiguation), multiple people

See also
Solovyovo, several rural localities in Russia
Soloveitchik
Ayedonitsky

References

Russian-language surnames